Douglas County is a county in the U.S. state of Minnesota. As of the 2020 United States Census, the population was 39,006. Its county seat is Alexandria.

Douglas County comprises the Alexandria, Minnesota, Micropolitan Statistical Area.

Douglas County is the home of Minnesota's only wine-grape appellation, the  Alexandria Lakes AVA.

History
The territorial legislature created Douglas County on March 8, 1858, shortly before Minnesota attained statehood. It was named for political figure Stephen A. Douglas, who was serving as a US Senator from Illinois at the time of the county's creation. The county organization was completed in 1866.

Geography
Spruce Creek flows southeast through northeastern Douglas county. The county consists of rolling hills, heavily dotted with lakes and ponds, especially in its north-to-south central portion. The hilly terrain generally slopes to the south and west; its highest point is near the northeast corner, at 1,483' (452m) ASL. It contains more than 250 lakes.

The county includes two of Minnesota's biomes: prairie grassland in the west and southeast, savannas (also prairie ecosystems) in the middle, and temperate deciduous forest in the south-central, north, and east. Douglas is one of 17 Minnesota counties where savanna soils predominate.

Major highways

 Interstate 94
 U.S. Highway 52
 Minnesota State Highway 27
 Minnesota State Highway 29
 Minnesota State Highway 55
 Minnesota State Highway 79
 Minnesota State Highway 114

Airports
 Alexandria Municipal Airport ("Chandler Field"), city-owned public-use airport

Adjacent counties

 Otter Tail County - north
 Todd County - east
 Stearns County - southeast
 Pope County - south
 Stevens County - southwest
 Grant County - west

Protected areas
Michael Gabriel burdine d.o.b 11-12-1992
 Anderson State Wildlife Management Area
 Balgaard State Wildlife Management Area
 Chermak State Wildlife Management Area
 Herberger Lake State Wildlife Management Area
 Kensington State Wildlife Management Area
 La Grand State Wildlife Management Area
 Lake Carlos State Park
 Osakis State Wildlife Management Area North Unit (part)
 Red Rock Wildlife Management Area
 Roger M. Holmes State Wildlife Management Area
 Schnepf State Wildlife Management Area
 Thornberg State Wildlife Management Area
 Urness State Wildlife Management Area

Demographics

2000 census
As of the 2000 census, there were 32,821 people, 13,276 households, and 9,027 families in the county. The population density was 51.5/sqmi (19.9/km2). There were 16,694 housing units at an average density of 26.2/sqmi (10.1/km2). The racial makeup of the county was 98.49% White, 0.18% Black or African American, 0.24% Native American, 0.40% Asian, 0.03% Pacific Islander, 0.18% from other races, and 0.48% from two or more races. 0.59% of the population were Hispanic or Latino of any race. 38.5% were of German, 24.6% Norwegian and 8.1% Swedish ancestry.

There were 13,276 households, out of which 29.90% had children under the age of 18 living with them, 59.00% were married couples living together, 6.40% had a female householder with no husband present, and 32.00% were non-families. 26.50% of all households were made up of individuals, and 12.30% had someone living alone who was 65 years of age or older. The average household size was 2.42 and the average family size was 2.93.

The county population contained 24.00% under the age of 18, 9.20% from 18 to 24, 25.00% from 25 to 44, 23.80% from 45 to 64, and 17.90% who were 65 years of age or older. The median age was 40 years. For every 100 females there were 99.00 males. For every 100 females age 18 and over, there were 96.90 males.

The median income for a household in the county was $37,703, and the median income for a family was $46,250. Males had a median income of $30,968 versus $21,240 for females. The per capita income for the county was $18,850. About 5.60% of families and 8.50% of the population were below the poverty line, including 9.30% of those under age 18 and 11.00% of those age 65 or over.

2020 Census

Communities

Cities

 Alexandria (county seat)
 Brandon
 Carlos
 Evansville
 Forada
 Garfield
 Kensington
 Millerville
 Miltona
 Nelson
 Osakis (part)

Unincorporated communities

 Belle River
 Holmes City
 Leaf Valley
 Rose City

Townships

 Alexandria Township
 Belle River Township
 Brandon Township
 Carlos Township
 Evansville Township
 Holmes City Township
 Hudson Township
 Ida Township
 La Grand Township
 Lake Mary Township
 Leaf Valley Township
 Lund Township
 Millerville Township
 Miltona Township
 Moe Township
 Orange Township
 Osakis Township
 Solem Township
 Spruce Hill Township
 Urness Township

Government and politics
Douglas County traditionally votes Republican. In only one presidential election since 1964 has it selected the Democratic candidate.

See also
 National Register of Historic Places listings in Douglas County, Minnesota

References

External links
 Douglas County website
 Alexandria Area Economic Development Commission website
 Douglas County MN Area Manufacturing & Healthcare Opportunities

 
Minnesota counties
1866 establishments in Minnesota
Populated places established in 1866